Obrežje is a settlement in the Municipality of Brežice in eastern Slovenia, close to the border with Croatia. The area is part of the traditional region of Lower Carniola. It is now included with the rest of the municipality in the Lower Sava Statistical Region.

Border crossing
A major motorway border crossing is located here. Obrežje is the end/start of Slovenia's A2 motorway. It connects to Croatia's A3 Motorway. Both motorways form part of the European route E70. The Croatian settlement across the border is Bregana, part of the town of Samobor. From 21 December 2007, when Slovenia became part of the Schengen area, until 1 January 2023, when Croatia joined the Schengen area, the Obrežje–Bregana border crossing was a Schengen external crossing.

Events

References

External links
Obrežje on Geopedia

Populated places in the Municipality of Brežice
Croatia–Slovenia border crossings